Trevor Cook (born 2 July 1956) is an English former professional footballer who played in the Football League for Mansfield Town.

References

1956 births
Living people
English footballers
Association football forwards
English Football League players
Mansfield Town F.C. players